is a railway station on the Chikuho Main Line operated by JR Kyushu in Chikushino, Fukuoka Prefecture, Japan.

Lines

Station layout 
The station, which is unstaffed, consists of a side platform serving a single track. Across the track can be seen another, disused side platform as well as the track bed of a second track which has since been removed. A siding branches off the track and ends behind the platform and is used by track maintenance equipment. A small station building built in traditional Japanese style serves as a waiting room. A separate weather shelter is provided on the platform itself.

Adjacent stations

History 
With the privatization of Japanese National Railways (JNR), the successor of JGR, on 1 April 1987, control of the station passed to JR Kyushu.

Station numbering was introduced on 28 September 2018 with Chikuzen-Yamae being assigned station number JG04.

References

External links
Chikuzen-Yamae Station (JR Kyushu)

Railway stations in Fukuoka Prefecture